Peltotrupes profundus, the Florida deepdigger scarab, is a species of earth-boring scarab beetle in the family Geotrupidae. It is found in North America.

Subspecies
These two subspecies belong to the species Peltotrupes profundus:
 Peltotrupes profundus dubius Howden, 1955
 Peltotrupes profundus profundus

References

Further reading

 

Geotrupidae
Articles created by Qbugbot
Beetles described in 1952